Professor Bobo is a fictional character who appeared in the final three seasons of Mystery Science Theater 3000, a comedy television series that mocks B-movies. Played by Kevin Murphy (who also voiced and operated robot Tom Servo on the show), Bobo is a sapient, speaking gorilla from the year 2525, an homage to the film Planet of the Apes. According to his family tree, he is the son of Coco and heir to the great lineage of Godo, Mogo and Chim-Chim.

Professor Bobo is a curious mixture of eminent scientist, descended from a long line of supposedly respected apes, and of sensory-driven primate, often regressing to more primitive desires and actions. In the first three shows of Season 8, he leads an ape laboratory directed by the "Lawgiver" (Planet of the Apes) to continue the movie-watching "experiments" on Mike Nelson and his robots, again trapped in the Satellite of Love. In subsequent shows, Bobo travels with the Lawgiver, who turns out to be Pearl Forrester (inheriting the mad scientist role from her son, Dr. Clayton Forrester). Bobo ultimately becomes one of her henchmen after his planet is destroyed when Mike Nelson helps the apes and their new mutant friends activate an atomic bomb (a reference to PotA sequel Beneath the Planet of the Apes).

Despite his title of "Professor", Bobo demonstrated remarkably little intelligence after leaving Earth of 2525. He was revealed to be illiterate (which may apply only to English and not the ape language), and in episode #820: Space Mutiny, he inadvertently obstructed Pearl's attempts to free the "Mads" from captivity in Neronian Rome, and starts the Great Fire of Rome by knocking over a lamp in his haste to steal a wheel of cheese. In the final episode (#1013 Danger: Diabolik), he boasted of his new "job" at a zoo, possibly unaware of his future role as a specimen.

See also
 List of fictional primates

External links

Mystery Science Theater 3000 characters
Fictional gorillas
Television characters introduced in 1997
Male characters in television